Major-General John Keppel Ingold Douglas-Withers,  (11 December 1919 – 3 November 1997) was a British Army officer.

Military career
Douglas-Withers was commissioned into the Royal Artillery on 5 October 1940 and served as a forward observer during the Italian Campaign of the Second World War. After the war, he became Commander of 6th Infantry Brigade in December 1965, Chief of Staff, 1st (British) Corps in February 1968 and General Officer Commanding South West District in February 1970 before retiring in December 1971.

He was appointed a Commander of the Order of the British Empire in the 1969 Birthday Honours.

References

1919 births
1997 deaths
British Army major generals
Commanders of the Order of the British Empire
Recipients of the Military Cross
Royal Artillery officers
British Army personnel of World War II